Florida Tech Panther Stadium is an American football stadium located in Melbourne, Florida. The facility served as the home field for the NCAA Division II Florida Tech Panthers football team representing the Florida Institute of Technology, and is the home field for the Palm Bay Magnet High School Pirates football team. Prior to July 2015, the facility was known as Pirate Stadium before Florida Tech purchased naming rights for the stadium.

References

Florida Tech Panthers
College football venues
American football venues in Florida
High school football venues in the United States
Buildings and structures in Melbourne, Florida